Aleksandar Vasić (born June 17, 1987) is a Serbian former professional basketball player.

References

External links
 Profile at fiba.com 
 Profile at realgm.com

1987 births
Living people
Basketball League of Serbia players
KK Metalac Valjevo players
KK Sloboda Užice players
KK Tamiš players
OKK Beograd players
Serbian expatriate basketball people in Denmark
Serbian expatriate basketball people in North Macedonia
Serbian men's basketball players
Shooting guards
Sportspeople from Valjevo